Antonio Alberici (died 1506) was a Roman Catholic prelate who served as Bishop of Nepi e Sutri (1503–1506).

Biography
On 11 October 1503, Antonio Alberici was appointed during the papacy of Pope Pius III as Bishop of Nepi e Sutri.
He served as Bishop of Nepi e Sutri' until his death in 1506.

References

External links and additional sources
 (for Chronology of Bishops) 
 (for Chronology of Bishops) 

16th-century Italian Roman Catholic bishops
Bishops appointed by Pope Pius III
1506 deaths